Riski Novriansyah (born 23 November 1989) is an Indonesian professional footballer who plays as a striker for Liga 2 club Persipa Pati.

Club career

PSMS Medan
He was signed for PSMS Medan to play in Liga 2 in the 2020 season. This season was suspended on 27 March 2020 due to the COVID-19 pandemic. The season was abandoned and was declared void on 20 January 2021.

PSG Pati
In 2021, Riski signed a contract with Indonesian Liga 2 club PSG Pati. He made his 2021–22 Liga 2 debut on 26 September 2021, coming on as a starter in a 2–0 loss with Persis Solo at the Manahan Stadium, Surakarta.

Persipa Pati
Novriansyah was signed for Persipa Pati to play in Liga 2 in the 2022–23 season. He made his league debut on 30 August 2022 in a match against Nusantara United at the Moch. Soebroto Stadium, Magelang.

Honours

Club
Pelita Jaya U-21
 Indonesia Super League U-21: 2008–09
Sriwijaya
 Indonesia Super League: 2011–12
Semen Padang
 Liga 2 runner-up: 2018

References

External links 
 Riski Novriansyah at Soccerway
 Riski Novriansyah at Liga Indonesia

1989 births
Living people
Indonesian footballers
Indonesian expatriate footballers
Expatriate footballers in Brazil
Sportspeople from the Bangka Belitung Islands
People from Pangkal Pinang
Boavista F.C. players
Pelita Jaya FC players
Persijap Jepara players
Sriwijaya F.C. players
Gresik United players
Persiba Balikpapan players
Persita Tangerang players
Indonesian Premier Division players
Liga 1 (Indonesia) players
Indonesian Super League-winning players
Association football forwards